The 2011 Texas A&M Aggies baseball team represented Texas A&M University in the 2011 NCAA Division I baseball season. The Aggies played their home games at Olsen Field at Blue Bell Park. The team was coached by Rob Childress in his 6th season at Texas A&M.

The Aggies reached the College World Series, but were eliminated by California.

Personnel

Roster

Coaches

Schedule

Ranking movements

References

Texas A&M Aggies baseball seasons
Texas AandM Aggies
College World Series seasons
Texas AandM Aggies base
Texas AandM